is a Japanese politician who currently serves as the Chief Cabinet Secretary since October 2021. He is serving in the House of Representatives as a member of the Liberal Democratic Party.

Career 
A native of Kisarazu, Chiba and graduate of Waseda University, Matsuno originally wanted to work in the film industry but instead took a job in advertising at Lion Corporation. He was elected to the House of Representatives for the first time in 2000 after an unsuccessful run in 1996.

In the August 3, 2016 reshuffle, Matsuno joined the Shinzō Abe cabinet as Minister of education. Matsuno became the Chief Cabinet Secretary in the Cabinet of Japan under Prime Minister Fumio Kishida.

Controversy 

Affiliated to the openly revisionist lobby Nippon Kaigi, along with most members of the Abe cabinet, Matsuno denies the existence of the Imperial Japan sex slavery system known under the euphemism 'Comfort women', and in 2014 demanded the revision of the Kono and Murayama statements, considered as landmark declarations from Japanese governments towards the recognition of war crimes.

Matsuno is also a member of the following right-wing Diet groups:
Conference of parliamentarians on the Shinto Association of Spiritual Leadership (神道政治連盟国会議員懇談会 - Shinto Seiji Renmei Kokkai Giin Kondankai) - NB: SAS a.k.a. Sinseiren, Shinto Political League
Japan Rebirth (創生「日本」- Sosei Nippon)

References

External links 
  in Japanese.

1962 births
Living people
People from Kisarazu
Politicians from Chiba Prefecture
Waseda University alumni
Members of the House of Representatives (Japan)
Liberal Democratic Party (Japan) politicians
21st-century Japanese politicians
Education ministers of Japan
Historical negationism
Culture ministers of Japan
Science ministers of Japan
Sports ministers of Japan
Technology ministers of Japan
Chief Cabinet Secretaries of Japan